Shishuvinahala also known as Shishunala is a village in Shiggaon taluk of Haveri district in the state of Karnataka, India

Geography
Shishuvinahala is located at 15.095496N,75.323778E. This village lies between Hulagur and Gudigeri of Shiggaon taluk.

Demographics
 India census, Shishuvinahal had a population of 2,800 with 1,502 males and 1,298 females and 485 Households.

Importance of the village
Shishuvinahala is the birthplace of the great mystic poet Sri Shishunala Sharif. His contribution to the Kannada folklore is very much revered. There a Temple in the village where Sri Shishunala Sharif composed his poems.

Transport

Bus routes
Shishuvinahala is well connected by road. There are buses from Hubli, Savanur , Shiggaon and Hulagur.

Railways
The nearest Railway Stations are at Gudigeri and Saunshi.

See also
Gudgeri
Lakshmeshwar
Savanur
Kundgol
Shiggaon
Haveri
Karnataka

References 

Villages in Haveri district